The kingdom of Kasa, also known as Kasanga, was the dominant kingdom in lower Casamance (now Senegal) during the late 15th century. Most of the inhabitants of the realm were Banun or Kasanke. In the 15th century, Portuguese slave traders and navigators established a trading station in the area. They also formed trade relations with the king of Kasa. In the late 16th and early 17th century, the area fell under the domination of Kaabu.

References

Sources
Berry, Boubakar. Senegambia and the Atlantic Slave Trade, (Cambridge: University Press, 1998) p. 42
Clark and Phillips. Historical Dictionary of Senegal. p. 179-180

Kingdoms of Senegal